Panfilov District may refer to:

Panfilov District, Kazakhstan
Panfilov District, Kyrgyzstan